Kermia netrodes is a species of sea snail, a marine gastropod mollusk in the family Raphitomidae.

Description
The length of the shell attains 12 mm, its diameter 3.5 mm.

The long shell has an attenuate shape. It is straw-colored to brown colored with sparse brownish spiral beneath the sutures and below the periphery at the base of the shell. It contains 10 whorls of which 3 in the protoconch. The second and the third whorl are cancellate. The ovate-shaped aperture is narrow. The sinus is not deep. The outer lip is slightly incrassate. The columella is rather straight. The siphonal canal is not produced.

Distribution
This marine species occurs in the Persian Gulf.

References

External links
 

netrodes
Gastropods described in 1917